The academic study of new religious movements is known as new religions studies (NRS).
The study draws from the disciplines of anthropology, psychiatry, history, psychology, sociology, religious studies, and theology. Eileen Barker noted that there are five sources of information on new religious movements (NRMs): the information provided by such groups themselves, that provided by ex-members as well as the friends and relatives of members, organizations that collect information on NRMs, the mainstream media, and academics studying such phenomena.

The study of new religions is unified by its topic of interest, rather than by its methodology, and is therefore interdisciplinary in nature. A sizeable body of scholarly literature on new religions has been published, most of it produced by social scientists. Among the disciplines that NRS uses are anthropology, history, psychology, religious studies, and sociology. Of these approaches, sociology played a particularly prominent role in the development of the field, resulting in it being initially confined largely to a narrow array of sociological questions. This came to change in later scholarship, which began to apply theories and methods initially developed for examining more mainstream religions to the study of new ones.

The majority of research has been directed toward those new religions which have attracted a greater deal of public controversy; less controversial NRMs have tended to be the subject of less scholarly research. It has also been noted that scholars of new religions have often avoided researching certain movements which tend instead to be studied by scholars from other backgrounds; the feminist spirituality movement is usually examined by scholars of women's studies, African-American new religions by scholars of Africana studies, and Native American new religions by scholars of Native American studies.

Historical development

In Japan, the academic study of new religions appeared in the years following the Second World War. In the 1960s American sociologist John Lofland lived with Unification Church missionary Young Oon Kim and a small group of American church members in California and studied their activities in trying to promote their beliefs and win new members. Lofland noted that most of their efforts were ineffective and that most of the people who joined did so because of personal relationships with other members, often family relationships. Lofland published his findings in 1964 as a doctoral thesis entitled: "The World Savers: A Field Study of Cult Processes", and in 1966 in book form by Prentice-Hall as Doomsday Cult: A Study of Conversion, Proselytization, and Maintenance of Faith. It is considered to be one of the most important and widely cited studies of the process of religious conversion, as well as one of the first sociological studies of a new religious movement.

In Western nations the study of new religions became a distinct field in the 1970s; prior to this, new religions had been examined from varying perspectives, with Pentecostalism for instance being studied by church historians and cargo cults by anthropologists. This Western academic study of new religions emerged in response to growing public concerns regarding the emergence of various NRMs during the 1970s. By the latter part of that decade, increasing numbers of papers on new religions were being presented at the annual conferences of the American Academy of Religion, Society for the Scientific Study of Religion, and the Association for the Sociology of Religion. The manner in which the scholarly study of new religions rose to prominence due to the public perception that these movements were social threats bore similarities with the manner in which Islamic studies grew in Western nations following the September 11 attacks in 2001. The study of new religions would only be fully embraced by the Western religious studies establishment in the 1990s.

In 1988, the charity INFORM (Information Network Focus on Religious Movements) was established by Barker, who was then a professor of sociology at the London School of Economics. The organization was supported by the UK Home Office and the British established churches and was designed to conduct research and disseminate accurate information about new religions.
Barker established INFORM due to her "conviction that a great deal of unnecessary suffering has resulted from ignorance of the nature and characteristics of the current wave of [NRMs] in the West."
Also in 1988, the Italian scholar Massimo Introvigne established CESNUR (Centre for Studies on New Religions) in Turin; it brought together academics studying NRMs in both Europe and North America. In the United States, CESNUR gained representation through the Institute for the Study of American Religion in Santa Barbara, California, which was directed by J. Gordon Melton.

Scholars of new religion often operate in a politicized environment given that their research can be cited in legal briefs and judicial decisions regarding NRMs. In Barker's view, academic research into NRMs had practical applications in dealing with the problems that people experience with regard to NRMs. It can, for example, provide accurate information about a particular religious movement that can help guide an individual's reactions to the group; "an awareness of the complexity of a situation might help people to avoid precipitous actions that would later have been regretted." Sympathetic scholarly groups have been accused of uncritically believing what NRMs tell them, being pro-NRM, or ignoring the issues raised by ex-members. The term "cult apologists" is sometimes used.

The term "cult wars" has been used to describe controversies in the 1980s, 1990s, and early 2000s, when academics with a differing views of NRMs confronted each other, including through lawsuits. By the late 2000s, the confrontation had started subsiding.

Notable researchers

Inclusion in this list assumes having both the requisite training as well as actually conducting at least one research study on cults and/or new religious movements (using accepted methodological standards common in the research community), published in a peer-reviewed journal or academic book.

References

Sources cited

Further reading

 
  
 
 
 
 
 
 

Researchers
Cults and new religious movements
Religious studies
Researchers of new religious movements and cults